The 4 Deserts Ultramarathon Series is an annual series of four 250-kilometer (155-mile) races across deserts around the globe. The races were recognized as the world's leading endurance footrace series by TIME magazine in 2009 and 2010, as the "Ultimate test of human endurance".  The series was founded by American Mary K Gadams who founded RacingThePlanet in 2002.

The Gobi March, the series' inaugural race, was held in the Gobi Desert of western China in 2003. Over the following three years, an additional race was introduced in a new location each year. In 2004, the Atacama Crossing was held in the Atacama Desert of Chile. This was followed by the Sahara Race in the Sahara Desert of Egypt (Eastern Desert) in 2005. In 2006 a fourth race, called The Last Desert, took place in Antarctica and was the first year in which all 4 Deserts races were held in the same calendar year.

Competitors can enter any of the individual multiday races within the 4 Deserts Race Series, but if they wish to take part in The Last Desert (Antarctica) they must successfully finish at least two of the other races in the series.

To date, more than sixty races have been staged with more than 10,000 individuals representing 100+ countries in the races. Many participants return to compete in additional events, and there is a growing list of members in the 4 Deserts Club and 4 Deserts Grand Slam Club.

In 2013, a documentary film about 4 Deserts was released. Desert Runners, directed by Jennifer Steinman, follows four participants as they attempt to complete the series in 2010.  The Desert Runners documentary received many film awards.

4 Deserts Ultramarathon Series 

The events that combine to make the 4 Deserts Ultramarathon Series are:

Atacama Crossing (Chile)

The Atacama Crossing crosses Chile's Atacama Desert, the driest place on Earth. The Atacama Desert has a unique landscape of salt lakes, volcanoes, lava flows and sand dunes. Moreover, owing to its otherworldly appearance, the landscape has been compared to that of Mars and has been used as a location for filming Mars scenes, most notably in the television series Space Odyssey: Voyage to the Planets.

The Atacama Crossing is gruelling because of its terrain, harsh climate and altitude that averages 2,500 meters (8,000 feet) during the race. The race typically begins at its highest point of more than 3,000 meters in the Arcoiris Valley.

San Pedro de Atacama is the host town of the Atacama Crossing.

Gobi March (Mongolia)

Originally located in the Gobi Desert of China, since 2018 the race now takes place in various locations around the Mongolian area of the Gobi Desert, and is usually held in late August.

The Gobi March's challenges include the changes in temperature from the hot highlands  to the oppressive cold in sand dunes, the open sun, potential sandstorms and variety of terrain – soft sand-dunes, rocky tracks, steep hills, ridges and riverbeds.

A Shanghai-based competitor died of heatstroke after competing in the 2010 Gobi March. His brother (who was not at the race) claimed Racing the Planet was "reckless" to set such a course for non-professional athletes, and ill-prepared.

Namib Race (Namibia)

Originally hosted in the Sahara Desert of Egypt, the race is now located along the Skeleton Coast of Namibia. The Namib segment takes place, usually in late April, in the oldest desert in the world. Competitors have to contend with a variety of terrains, both rock and sand, but will face endless miles of sand dunes up to 122 metres (400 feet) high. Daytime temperatures reach 50 °C (122 °F).

In 2012 the race took place for the third time in the Western Desert around the region around Al Fayuum, Wadi El-Rayan Protected Area and The Valley of the Whales or Wadi Al-Hitan, a UNESCO World Heritage Site.

Due to political unrest the 2014 edition of the race was moved to Jordan where it crossed four deserts; Wadi Rum, Kharaza, Humaima and Wadi Araba before finishing in the ancient city of Petra. The 2016 event was relocated to the Namib Desert where it is expected to remain for some time.

The Last Desert (Antarctica)

The race uses a polar expedition ship as its base, traveling to the different course locations on the Antarctic Peninsula and offshore islands based on the prevailing sea and weather conditions, with competitors transferred from ship to shore by zodiacs. Since 2010, this segment has been held biannually in order to minimise its environmental impact, and usually takes place around the end of November.
 
The unique challenges of The Last Desert (Antarctica) include having to cope with the severity of the weather conditions that can include gale force blizzards and temperatures down to −20 °C (-4 °F). Competitors also have to deal with the unpredictability of daily stage lengths and start-times, as the prevailing environmental conditions dictate where and when stages might begin.

Fifteen individuals from around the world completed the inaugural event in 2006 becoming the first in the world to complete a 250 km footrace on the Antarctic continent.  The Last Desert 2010 took place in November of that year in King George Island, Deception Island, and Dorian Bay.  The Last Desert 2010 was featured 3 times on IMG's Transworld Sport.

RacingThePlanet Series 

The RacingThePlanet Ultramarathon was introduced in 2008 as the 4 Deserts saw a desire for multi-day, multi-stage races in new countries. The concept was to supplement with 4 Deserts Race Series with one-off races in new locations each year. These locations did not have to be deserts, but it was preferred that they would retain some of the most desirable elements of the races in the original series including locations that were off the beaten track and where beautiful, cultural and physically challenging courses could be set. So far, the RacingThePlanet Ultramarathon has been held in Vietnam (2008), Namibia (2009), Australia (2010), Nepal (2011), Jordan (2012), Iceland (2013) and Madagascar (2014), Ecuador (2015), Sri Lanka (2016), Patagonia (2017) and New Zealand (2019).  The RacingThePlanet Ultramarathon in 2021 is planned for Georgia, The Great Caucasus.

Event format

The 250-kilometer (155-mile) races take place over seven days and six stages. A campsite is raised each night for competitors where they are provided with a place in a tent to sleep, access to hot water, a campfire, medical assistance and the CyberTent where they can view and send messages to family and friends and update their race blog.

Competitors race from campsite to campsite each day following marker flags that have been planted the preceding day. They must pass through a series of checkpoints where they collect drinking water and can seek medical treatment.

Other than the access to the services described competitors must race completely self-supported, carrying all their food, supplies and equipment for the week. Each competitor must carry a selection of mandatory items at all times to help ensure their safety out on course.

Competitors must start each stage at the appointed time and on certain stages cut-off times are set which racers must meet in order to remain active in the event.

The results of the race are based on the cumulative time taken for the competitor to complete all the stages, and a competitor must successfully pass through every checkpoint in order to collect a finisher's medal.

Should a competitor withdraw from a particular stage, they may not continue in the race.

Charitable causes 

About 50% of competitors choose to support causes when racing at the 4 Deserts.

Because of the remote locations of many of the races RacingThePlanet choose to support a specific charity at almost every event, that provides support to the local community in which the event takes place. The company has a long running partnership with Operation Smile, and has raised over US$500,000 for the charity for projects in Vietnam, China and Egypt, often funding missions and surgeries in the local communities through which competitors race.

The company has donated books and sports equipment to schools in Xinjiang province where the Gobi March is held through the Esquel Y. L. Yang Education Fund who they have also supported for a number of years.

In 2008, the Gobi March took place just one month after the devastating earthquake in Sichuan Province on 12 May, so that year RacingThePlanet put together a special auction whereby friends and families of competitors could bid to buy a hot shower for three competitors at the end of the 90 km Stage 5 of the event. An unheard of and never-to-be-repeated luxury. The auction raised almost US$30,000 for the Red Cross disaster fund.

Again in 2010 another earthquake affected a country that plays host to a 4 Deserts race. The Chilean earthquake of 27 February occurred just one week before the start of the Atacama Crossing. RacingThePlanet and the community of competitors and friends raised US$15,000 for Habitat for Humanity in the weeks to follow.

4 Deserts Champions 

4 Deserts Champions are crowned in the male and female categories at the end of every edition of The Last Desert (Antarctica). Since 2010, champions have been recognized in an official Awards Ceremony at the conclusion of the Antarctic race; champions from previous years have been crowned retrospectively.

4 Deserts Champions are determined by adding the finishing rankings of every The Last Desert competitor over each of the four races in the series. For this reason, only 4 Deserts Club members are eligible for the award. The lowest aggregate score in the male and female categories is named a 4 Deserts Champion.

In 2010, Ryan Sandes of South Africa recorded the lowest and unbeatable aggregate score of 4 points as he had won each of the 4 Deserts races he had entered. In 2012, Spanish racer Vicente Juan Garcia Beneito and German competitor Anne-Marie Flammersfeld repeated this feat by winning all four races in the same calendar year and qualifying for the 4 Deserts Grand Slam.

4 Deserts Champions:

2018

Male : Wong Ho-chung (Hong Kong)

2014

Male: José Manuel Martínez Fernandez (Spain)

Female: Isis Breiter (Mexico)

2012

Male: Vicente Juan Garcia Beneito (Spain)

Female: Anne-Marie Flammersfeld (Germany)

2010

Male: Ryan Sandes (South Africa)

Female: Mirjana Pellizzer (Croatia)

2008

Male: Dean Karnazes (United States)

Female: Laura Corti (Italy)

2007

Male: Francesco Galanzino (Italy)

Female: none

2006

Male: Yi Chieh (Kevin) Lin (Taiwan)

Female: Lisanne Dorian (United States)

4 Deserts Grand Slam 

The 4 Deserts Grand Slam has been so named by competitors attempting to complete all the events in the 4 Deserts Race Series in one calendar year.

The first Grand Slam was first attempted in 2008 when five competitors set out to complete the task and two were ultimately successful. The first two competitors to be named Grand Slammers were famed endurance athlete Dean Karnazes of the United States and Paul Liebenberg of South Africa. In 2010, fourteen competitors attempted to complete the feat and nine, including the first three women, were successful. The Grand Slam has become increasingly popular in the years in which all 4 Deserts take place.

4 Deserts Grand Slammers:

2014

Juan Carlos Albarran (Spain), Asger Bech-Thomsen (Denmark), Paul Borlinha (Canada), Isis Breiter (Mexico), Chris Calimano (United States), Arthur Chu (Philippines), Brett Foote (Australia), Michael Gilgen (Switzerland), Jose Luis Gomez Alciturri (Spain), Andrzej Gondek (Poland), Kyungpyo Hong (South Korea), Linh Huynh (Canada), Daniel Lewczuk (Poland), Andres Lledo Lopez (Spain), Jose Manuel Martinez Fernandez (Spain), Atul Patki (India), Inia Raumati (New Zealand), Rob Trepa (United States), Marek Wikiera (Poland)

2012

Jess Baker (Australia), Cécile Bertin (France), Gyouyoung Choi (South Korea), Christian Colque (Argentina), Alper Dalkilic (Turkey), Greg Donovan (Australia), Matthew Donovan (Australia), Jeison Duarte da Costa (Brazil), Anne-Marie Flammersfeld (Germany), Vicente Juan Garcia Beneito (Spain), James Gaston (United States), Tara Gaston (United States), Roger Hanney (Australia), Sanghyeon Kim (South Korea), Dan Leiner (Luxembourg), Ron Schwebel (Australia), Shayne Stoik (Canada), Seung Chul Youn (South Korea)

2010

Paul Acheson (England), Samantha Gash (Australia), Peter Jong (Australia), Stan Lee (Canada), Terumasa Mori (Japan), David O'Brien (Ireland), Linda Quirk (United States) Lucy Rivers-Bulkeley (England), Philip Tye (England)

2008

Dean Karnazes (United States), Paul Liebenberg (South Africa)

Individual race results 

Times are shown in hours:minutes:seconds

Atacama Crossing (Chile)

Gobi March (China)

Sahara Race (Egypt)

Last Desert (Antarctica) 

Overall results are calculated differently for The Last Desert (Antarctica) as weather and sea conditions make it difficult to cover a full 250 kilometers. In these cases, overall rankings are  based on total distance covered rather than overall time.

Roving Races

References

External links
 4 Deserts Ultramarathon Series
 Atacama Crossing (Chile)
 Gobi March (Mongolia)
 Namib Race (Namibia)
 The Last Desert (Antarctica)
 Pictures of the Atacama Crossing 2010 by competitor Rob Plijnaar

Multiday races
Ultramarathons
Sport in Chile
Sport in Mongolia
Sport in Namibia
Atacama Desert
Gobi Desert
Sahara